"You & Me" is a 1985 single by The Flirts, a vocal trio based in New York City. The single, taken from their album "Blondes, Brunettes, and Redheads," was produced by Bobby Orlando, the creator/founder of the group, and shared co-writing credits with Clifton "Jiggs" Chase. The featured vocalists on this single were Tricia Wygal, Debra "Debbie" Gaynor, and Christina Criscione.

Background
In the United States, the single was a number-one hit on the dance chart for one week, thanks in part to a remix by Shep Pettibone and fueled by a music video that featured the trio in a "Rags to Riches" themed setting. The video featured a Billboard headline proclaiming "The Flirts Are Hits," but "You & Me", along the rest of The Flirts' releases, failed to cross over to the other charts.

Track listings
 12 inch (US)
A. You & Me  6:15  
B1. You & Me (Instrumental)  6:40  
B2. You & Me (Dub)  6:00

References

External links
Music Video from YouTube

1985 singles
The Flirts songs
Columbia Records singles
Songs written by Bobby Orlando
Song recordings produced by Bobby Orlando
1985 songs